Andover USD 385, also known as Andover Public Schools, is a public unified school district headquartered in Andover, Kansas, United States.  The district includes the communities of Andover, Lorena, and nearby rural areas.

Schools
The school district operates the following schools:

High schools:
 Andover High School
 Andover Central High School

Middle School:
 Andover Middle School
 Andover Central Middle School 

Elementary School:
 Cottonwood Elementary
 Meadowlark Elementary
 Prairie Creek Elementary
 Robert M. Martin Elementary
 Sunflower Elementary
 Wheatland Elementary

History
On April 30, a EF3 Tornado swept through Andover causing damage and closing the school of Prairie Creek Elementary.

See also
 Kansas State Department of Education
 Kansas State High School Activities Association
 List of high schools in Kansas
 List of unified school districts in Kansas

References

External links
 

School districts in Kansas
Education in Butler County, Kansas